Daredevils was a punk rock band from Los Angeles, California.

History
The punk band was formed by guitarist Brett Gurewitz after his 1994 departure from Bad Religion. 

The Daredevils were Brett Gurewitz, director Gore Verbinski, Dean Opseth, and Josh Freese. 

The group released only one single "Hate You", with the B Side "Rules, Hearts" and disbanded.

Members
 Brett Gurewitz - guitar, vocals (see also Bad Religion)
 Gore Verbinski - guitar (see also Little Kings)
 Dean Opseth - bass (see also Medicine)
 Josh Freese - drums (see also A Perfect Circle, Guns N' Roses, The Offspring, The Vandals, Nine Inch Nails)

Discography
 Hate You (1996)

Music videos
 Hate You (1996)

References

Punk rock groups from California
Rock music supergroups
Musical groups established in 1994
Musical groups from Los Angeles
1994 establishments in California